Andromachus was a grammarian of ancient Greece. He was quoted in the scholia on Homer. There has been disagreement among scholars about whether he was the author of the Etymologicum Magnum.

References

Ancient Greek grammarians
Year of birth unknown